The Kharasch addition is an organic reaction and a metal-catalysed free radical addition of CXCl3 compounds (X = Cl, Br, H) to alkenes.  The reaction is used to append trichloromethyl or dichloromethyl groups to terminal alkenes.  The method has attracted considerable interest, but it is of limited value because of narrow substrate scope and demanding conditions.

The basic reaction proceeds through the CXCl2 free radical. Examples of organohalides are carbon tetrachloride and chloroform. Radicals are often generated by abstraction of a halide radical my a metal ion. The addition is an anti-Markovnikov addition. Early work linked the addition to olefin polymerization  and is therefore considered a first step into what was to become atom transfer radical polymerization.

An example of Kharasch addition is the synthesis of 1,1,3-trichloro-n-nonane from 1-octene and chloroform using an iron-based catalyst.

History
The reaction was discovered by Morris S. Kharasch in the 1940s.

References

Organic reactions
Free radical reactions
Name reactions